= Alex Richter =

Professor Alex Richter FRCPath (born June 1972) is professor of clinical immunology and director of the Clinical Immunology Service at the University of Birmingham.

== Selected publications ==
- Richter, Alex; Plant, Tim; Kidd, Michael; Bosworth, Andrew; Mayhew, Megan; Megram, Oliver; Ashworth, Fiona; Crawford, Liam; White, Thomas; Moles-Garcia, Emma; Mirza, Jeremy; Percival, Benita; McNally, Alan (December 2020). "How to establish an academic SARS-CoV-2 testing laboratory". Nature Microbiology. 5 (12): 1452–1454. doi:10.1038/s41564-020-00818-3. ISSN 2058-5276. PMID 33139885. (First co-author)
- Shields, Adrian M.; Burns, Siobhan O.; Savic, Sinisa; Richter, Alex G. (March 2021). "COVID-19 in patients with primary and secondary immunodeficiency: The United Kingdom experience". The Journal of Allergy and Clinical Immunology. 147 (3): 870–875.e1. doi:10.1016/j.jaci.2020.12.620. ISSN 1097-6825. PMC 7737531. PMID 33338534.
